Walter Dalgal (born 24 June 1954 in Charleroi) is a Belgian-Italian former road cyclist. Professional from 1976 to 1989, he won the Grand Prix de Wallonie in 1981 and the Druivenkoers Overijse in 1983.

Major results

1976
 8th Druivenkoers Overijse
1977
 2nd Circuit des Frontières
 7th Omloop van het Zuidwesten
1978
 3rd Druivenkoers Overijse
 8th Tour du Condroz
1979
 2nd Brussels–Ingooigem
 3rd Omloop van de Vlaamse Scheldeboorden
 6th Ronde van Limburg
 8th Circuit des Frontières
1981
 1st Grand Prix de Wallonie
 2nd GP du Tournaisis
 3rd GP Stad Vilvoorde
 9th Dwars door België
1982
 3rd Druivenkoers Overijse
 4th Grand Prix de Fourmies
 7th Grand Prix Impanis-Van Petegem
 8th Kampioenschap van Vlaanderen
 8th GP du Tournaisis
 10th Circuit des Frontières
1983
 1st Druivenkoers Overijse
1984
 5th Omloop van het Houtland
 9th GP Victor Standaert
1985
 4th GP Industria & Artigianato
1986
 3rd Binche–Tournai–Binche
1987
 3rd Grand Prix d'Isbergues
1988
 7th Bordeaux–Paris
1989
 2nd GP de la Ville de Rennes
 9th Binche–Tournai–Binche

References

External links

1954 births
Living people
Belgian male cyclists
Italian male cyclists
Sportspeople from Charleroi
Cyclists from Hainaut (province)